Nicolás Fernández Miranda (born November 25, 1972 in Buenos Aires, Argentina) is a former rugby union footballer. He won over 40 caps, with six as captain playing at scrum half for the Argentina rugby union side (los Pumas). He made his international test debut at the age of 21 on 28 May 1994 against the United States. He scored 5 tries for Argentina. He played most of his career for the Hindú Club in Argentina. He spent the 2002 season playing for the South African side Sharks, and the 2003 season for Petrarca in Italy. He then returned to Hindú Club.

His brother is Juan Fernández Miranda.

External links
Nicolás Fernández Miranda from the Unión Argentina de Rugby 

1972 births
Rugby union players from Buenos Aires
Argentine rugby union players
Living people
Rugby union scrum-halves
Argentina international rugby union players
Hindú Club players